John Polando (1901–1985) was an early American aviation pioneer who, along with Russell Boardman, flew from Floyd Bennett Field to Istanbul in 1931 to set an aviation record for the longest continuous distance flown without refueling. Following this achievement, he was an officer in World War II.

Biography

Early life
Born in 1901 in Lynn, Massachusetts, Polando learned to fly in 1918. After joining the United States Army Air Corps in 1927, he met Russell Boardman at a "Wall of Death" motorcycle event in Revere. Deciding that Boardman would make a good co-pilot, the two teamed up and began to pursue a dream of breaking a world record.

Record attempt
The two men trained at Hyannis Airport in preparation for their trip to Istanbul.

The attempt at the record took place between July 28 and 30, 1931. Polando and Russell Boardman took off from Floyd Bennett Field in the aircraft Cape Cod.The plane was a Bellanca Special J6 monoplane. Eighteen minutes later, Clyde Edward Pangborn and Hugh Herndon Jr. took off from Floyd Bennett in an unsuccessful attempt to circumnavigate the world. Boardman and Polando then flew over Newfoundland and dropped the New York Times at lighthouses in the province. Along the way, they also flew over Ireland, Paris, and Munich. They also circled the Swiss Alps at night to avoid crashing into them. While it was originally planned for them to fly to Moscow, it was determined that Istanbul would be easier, because it would allow for them to still break the record.

Following the landing of their aircraft in Istanbul, they were greeted with great fanfare.

Death and legacy
Polando died in 1985 as a result of injuries sustained in an aircraft accident. In 1981, on the 50th anniversary of their record flight, Barnstable Municipal Airport added Boardman-Polando Field to its name to recognize their accomplishment.

References

1901 births
1985 deaths
Aviators from Massachusetts
People from Lynn, Massachusetts
United States Army Air Forces officers
Flight distance record holders
American aviation record holders
Victims of aviation accidents or incidents in the United States
Military personnel from Massachusetts